This is a list of settlements in Staffordshire with over 5,000 inhabitants based on the data from the article on each settlement which in turn is taken from the 2001 and 2011 UK Censuses. The entire population of Staffordshire is 1,069,000. Staffordshire has two cities, Stoke on Trent and Lichfield. There are a number of towns but the majority of settlements in the county are small rural villages.

External links 

Census 2001 website

References 

Settlements
Towns in Staffordshire
Staffordshire